Mary Jossy Nakhanda Okwakol (born 1951) is a Ugandan university professor, academic administrator, zoologist and community leader. She is the current chairperson of the Uganda National Examinations Board.

Before that, from October 2006 until May 2017, served as Vice Chancellor of Busitema University, one of the nine public universities in Uganda.

Background and education
She was born in Namunyumya Village, Iganga District, Eastern Uganda, circa 1951. She attended Namunyumya Mixed Primary School, for her elementary schooling. Mary Okwakol attended Mount Saint Mary's College Namagunga for her high school education.

She holds the degree of Bachelor of Science (BSc) in Zoology, obtained in 1974, from Makerere University, the oldest university in East Africa. She also holds the degree of Master of Science (MSc), in Zoology, obtained in 1976, also from Makerere University. Her degree of Doctor of Philosophy (PhD) in Zoology was also obtained from Makerere University, in 1992.

Career
After graduating from Makerere in 1974, Mary Okwakol was invited back to the Faculty of Science as an assistant lecturer. She immediately embarked on her Masters studies and graduated in 1976. She was appointed lecturer. In 1988, she became a senior lecturer. She enrolled in the PhD program at the University of Oxford in the United Kingdom, but was unable to continue due to family responsibilities in Uganda. She transferred to Makerere and graduated in 1992. She has since been awarded full professorship by Makerere. At the formation of Gulu University in 2004, she was appointed deputy vice chancellor, serving in that capacity until her appointment as vice chancellor of Busitema University in 2006. In 2019,Mary was appointed as the  Executive Director of National Council of Higher Education, a position she holds as of 2021.

Other responsibilities
Professor Okwakol is a member of the Forum for African Women Educationalists, a pan-African non-governmental organisation, founded in 1992, that is active in 32 African countries. The forum aims to empower girls and women through gender-responsive education. Its members include human rights activists, gender specialists, researchers, education policy-makers, university vice-chancellors and ministers of education. The organisation maintains its headquarters in Nairobi, Kenya, and has regional offices in Dakar, Senegal. Professor Okwakol has published widely in professional journals and has written chapters in scientific books pertaining to her fields of specialization. In May 2014 she was appointed to serve as the chairperson of the Uganda National Examinations Board.

See also

References

External links
 Website of Busitema University

Living people
Makerere University alumni
People from Iganga District
People from Eastern Region, Uganda
Ugandan Christians
Vice-chancellors of universities in Uganda
1951 births
Iganga District
Ugandan women academics
People educated at Mount Saint Mary's College Namagunga
Fellows of Uganda National Academy of Sciences
Academic staff of Busitema University